Dracaena surculosa, called the gold dust dracaena and spotted dracaena, is a species of flowering plant in the family Asparagaceae, native to west and west-central tropical Africa, from Guinea to the Republic of the Congo. Its cultivar 'Florida Beauty' has gained the Royal Horticultural Society's Award of Garden Merit.

Subtaxa
The following varieties are accepted:
Dracaena surculosa var. maculata Hook.f.
Dracaena surculosa var. surculosa

References

surculosa
House plants
Flora of Benin
Flora of Ghana
Flora of Guinea
Flora of Ivory Coast
Flora of Liberia
Flora of Nigeria
Flora of Sierra Leone
Flora of Togo
Flora of Cameroon
Flora of the Central African Republic
Flora of the Republic of the Congo
Flora of Gabon
Flora of the Gulf of Guinea islands
Plants described in 1828